The National Famine Commemoration Day is an annual observance in Ireland commemorating the Great Famine. A week-long programme of events leads up to the day, usually a Sunday in May. It has been organised officially by the government of Ireland since 2008. The main event is held in a different place each year, rotating among the four provinces of Ireland. There is also an international event, held in a place important for the Irish diaspora.

Events at the main venue include lectures, arts events, and visits to places connected to the Famine. The government encourages local events, and a minute's silence on the day, or the preceding Friday for schools and workplaces.

History

The Great Famine lasted from 1845 to about 1850, with "Black '47" the worst year. In 1994 the government established a committee to fund events and works commemorating the Famine's 150th anniversary, which operated until 2000.

In County Mayo from 1987, an annual "Famine Walk" from Louisburgh to Doolough has commemorated the Doolough Tragedy of 30–31 March 1849. From 2004, the Committee for the Commemoration of the Irish Famine Victims (CCIFV) has organised an annual commemoration each May in Dublin, in which members dressed as starving peasants walk from the Garden of Remembrance to the famine memorial sculptures in front of the Custom House. The CCIFV lobbied for official recognition and received various messages of support from politicians. Taoiseach Bertie Ahern answered several Dáil questions on the CCIFV and Famine commemoration generally. In 2005, he was reluctant to countenance a designated annual national day to commemorate the Famine; he favoured a single memorial to all major historical events, mentioning the 1798 Rebellion and the Land War. In 2006, he said the Department of the Taoiseach was examining submissions on Famine commemoration. In 2007, he was "Positively disposed towards the establishment of a memorial day". That year, the day of the CCIFV walk received a modicum of official recognition, with one reception hosted by Conor Lenihan, Minister of State responsible for food aid, and another by Bertie Ahern at Iveagh House. The Friday before the 2008 CCIFV walk, the government issued a press release announcing that the state would in future organise an annual commemoration. That Sunday there was a reception hosted by Minister of State John Curran at the Custom House, Dublin before the CCIFV walk. A July press release of the Department of Community, Rural and Gaeltacht Affairs described this as "the first National Famine Commemoration Day".

In July 2008 Éamon Ó Cuív, the Minister for Community, Rural and Gaeltacht Affairs, established the National Famine Commemoration Committee, whose stated main objective was:
to consider the most appropriate arrangement for future national commemorations of the Great Famine.  The general legacy of emigration, cultural loss and the decline of the Irish language, together with the specific issues of food security and the strong commitment of the Irish people to humanitarian aid and relief, are particular themes that will be explored by the Committee during its work.
This committee has recommended the venue for subsequent commemorations, and liaised with each local organising committee. The event is staged in each province in rotation. The 2011 event was scheduled for Ulster, and in October 2010 two Sinn Féin ministers in the Northern Ireland Executive discussed the possibility of a Northern Ireland host venue with Pat Carey, Ó Cuív's successor as the Republic's Minister for Community, Rural and Gaeltacht Affairs. In the event, Clones, County Monaghan, in the Republic, was chosen. Northern Ireland was the location of the next Ulster host: Newry, County Armagh in 2015.

In December 2016, Sinn Féin introduced a private member's bill seeking to have the commemoration held on the second Sunday of every May every year. Peadar Tóibín said, "we do not know at this late stage when the national Famine day will take place next year. This annual uncertainty over the commemoration date is shocking". Colm Brophy of Fine Gael introduced a similar bill in January 2017.

Venues

See also
 National Day of Commemoration

References

External links
 Irish Famine official website of the National Famine Commemoration Committee
 National Famine Commemoration Department of Culture, Heritage and the Gaeltacht

Great Famine (Ireland)
Remembrance days
Annual events in Ireland
2008 establishments in Ireland
Recurring events established in 2008
May observances
Spring (season) events in the Republic of Ireland